Rickling is a village and former civil parish, now in the parish of Quendon and Rickling, in the Uttlesford district of Essex, England. In 1931 the parish had a population of 378.

Rickling is the site of the parish church, All Saints, and a few houses. Rickling Green,  from Rickling, is conjoined to Quendon.

History

The name Rickling is found in the Domesday Book as Richelinga. It is recorded as having quite a large population of 34 households, and it paid substantial taxes of eight geld units.

Richelinga or Rickling  derives from an Old English personal name Ricula and inga, thus ‘followers of the people of Ricula’. The wife of Sledda King of the East Saxons (c.587-604) and sister of Æthelberht of Kent was named Ricula, though an association with this manor has not been proven. 

It is not known definitively why the main population today at Rickling Green is so far from its church at Rickling, but it has been suggested this may have been due to the plague. Another theory is that, over time, the villagers settled closer to the once busy drovers' road (the former A11) that runs through Quendon.

On 1 April 1949 the parish was abolished and merged with Quendon to form "Quendon and Rickling".

Amenities
There is a small primary school in Rickling Green, serving the village and surrounding communities and joined in federation with Farnham primary school, with the schools sharing one head teacher and governing body.

There is also a public house, The Cricketers Arms, Rickling Green (not to be confused with The Cricketers in nearby Clavering), which overlooks the green. The village green is also home to Rickling Ramblers Cricket Club. Cricket has been played on the green since 1850 and takes place throughout the summer months.

Landmarks

All Saints' Church, Rickling, a Grade I listed building, is a 13th-century flint church, although the nave's unusual proportions may indicate a pre-conquest date. The chancel, south aisle and west tower were built in 1340. There were later alterations in the 15th and 16th centuries, with further additions and restoration in the 19th century. Significant features include the 14th-century chancel screen and the pulpit.

Rickling Hall, a Grade II* listed farmhouse, stands on the site of a former castle and includes a moated castle mound to the south of the present building. Rickling and Rickling Green contain a number of other listed buildings, many of them dating from the 17th century.

See also
 The Hundred Parishes

References

External sources

Village website
Quendon and Rickling churches website
Cricketers Arms, Rickling Green
Federation of Farnham and Rickling C of E primary schools

Villages in Essex
Former civil parishes in Essex
Uttlesford